Sulphur Springs is an unincorporated community in Johnson County, Arkansas, United States.

References

Unincorporated communities in Johnson County, Arkansas
Unincorporated communities in Arkansas